United Nations Security Council Resolution 104, adopted unanimously on June 20, 1954, after receiving a communication from the Government of Guatemala to the President of the Security Council, the Council called for the immediate termination of any action likely to cause bloodshed and requested all Member of the United Nations to abstain, in the spirit of the Charter, from rendering assistance to any such action.

See also
1954 Guatemalan coup d'état
List of United Nations Security Council Resolutions 101 to 200 (1953–1965)

References
Text of the Resolution at undocs.org

External links
 

 0104
 0104
1954 in Guatemala
June 1954 events